Doug Easlick (born December 4, 1980, in Mount Holly, New Jersey) is a former American football fullback who played in the National Football League for the Miami Dolphins in the 2004 season. 

After playing at Cherokee High School and playing college football for the Virginia Tech Hokies football, Easlick played for the Miami Dolphins and Cincinnati Bengals.

Easlick currently works for Graham Company, located in Philadelphia.

References

1980 births
Living people
Cherokee High School (New Jersey) alumni
Players of American football from New Jersey
People from Mount Holly, New Jersey
Sportspeople from Burlington County, New Jersey
Virginia Tech Hokies football players
Miami Dolphins players
Cincinnati Bengals players